Baptist University refers to a group of universities operated or founded by Baptist Church

The following are the list of world baptist universities

 Atlantic Baptist University
 California Baptist University
 Dallas Baptist University
 Houston Baptist University
 Hong Kong Baptist University
 Southwest Baptist University
 Ouachita Baptist University
 Wayland Baptist University